Warren Travis White High School is a public secondary school in Dallas, Texas (USA). W. T. White High School enrolls students in grades 9-12 and is a part of the Dallas Independent School District.

The school, named in honor of the Dallas school superintendent who served from 1946 to 1968, is located in North Dallas about a mile southwest of the Interstate 635 (LBJ Freeway) and Dallas North Tollway intersection. Parts of North Dallas are zoned to W. T. White, as well as sections of Addison, Carrollton, and Farmers Branch.

In 2015, the school was rated "Met Standard" by the Texas Education Agency.

History 
The school was established in 1964 and named for the superintendent then in office, Dr. Warren Travis White. The current principal is Beth Wing.

Campus
The original school building was designed for 1,600 students. By 2015 W.T. White had over 2,300 students, which meant that the school was at 160% of its capacity. The campus had portable buildings installed to handle excess students. In 2015 the DISD board approved a $21 million renovation and expansion of the campus as part of a school improvement program worth almost $130 million; the renovation will add  of space. WRA Architects is in charge of the project and a graduate of W.T. White is the head architect. The project is scheduled for completion in the fall of 2017.

Vocational academies
The school has some career-oriented academies, such as the Academy of Engineering.

Demographics
In 2009, the state classified almost half of White's graduates as "college ready," or ready to undergo university studies. The State of Texas defined "college readiness" by scores on the ACT and SAT and in the 11th grade Texas Assessment of Knowledge and Skills (TAKS) tests."

In 2019 80.00% of the student body consisted of diversity students.

Service area

Parts of North Dallas are zoned to W. T. White, as well as sections of Addison, Carrollton, and Farmers Branch.

Communities served as of 1967 include: Crestpark Club Estates (Farmers Branch).

Communities served as of 1969 include: Willow Park Square (Dallas).

Athletics
The W.T. White Longhorns compete in the following sports:

Baseball
Basketball
Cross Country
Football
Golf
Soccer
Softball
Swimming and Diving
Tennis
Track and Field
Volleyball
Wrestling

Sports achievements
Football

City Championship-Dallas

1976

District Championships

1971 11-4A, 1974 11-4A, 1976 11-4A, 1977 11-4A, 1978 11-4A, 1979 11-4A, 1990 11-4A, 1994 12-4A

Notable alumni 

 Jean Barrett (1968) – former NFL offensive lineman 1973–1980, San Francisco 49ers
 Trey Beamon (1992) – former Major League Baseball outfielder 1996–98, Pittsburgh Pirates, San Diego Padres, Detroit Tigers
 David Beecroft (1974) – television actor (Falcon Crest, Melrose Place, Dr. Quinn, Medicine Woman)
 Vice Admiral John G. Cotton (1969) – former chief of United States Navy Reserve<ref name="cotton">Gretel C. Kovach. "Q&A with Vice Adm. John G. Cotton - 'My friends were murdered. So I'm doing it for them.' - Former American Airlines pilot sets out to make the Navy 'one team'," The Dallas Morning News, September 26, 2004, Sunday Reader section, page 6H.</ref>
 Bryan Holaday (2006) – Major League Baseball catcher for Detroit Tigers
 Karen Hughes (1974) – U.S. Under Secretary for Public Diplomacy and Public Affairs
 Gary Jacobs (1970) – executive producer and head writer of hit TV series Empty Nest; creator of Woops! and All-American Girl; writer on Newhart Calvin Murray (1989) – former Major League Baseball outfielder 1999–2004, San Francisco Giants, Texas Rangers, Chicago CubsKen Stephens. "Baseball's lack of blacks: faster sports, inner-city troubles steer them away from game," The Dallas Morning News, May 28, 1989, Sports Day section, page 1B: "Calvin Murray has every skill a major league scout could want in a baseball player -- able to hit, hit with power, run, throw and field. At the very least, Murray, a senior at Dallas' W.T. White High School, will attend the University of Texas next fall on a baseball scholarship. But Murray, ranked the nation's No. 7 prospect by Baseball America, likely will be a high pick in the major league draft June 5 and might opt to sign a professional contract."
 Ramón Núñez (2003) – English Football League Championship midfielder for Leeds United;  Honduras national team 2007–present
 Johnny Simmons (2005) – actor, Dylan Baxter in Evan Almighty (2007), Young Spirit in The Spirit (2008), Dave in Hotel for Dogs (2009), Chip in Jennifer's Body (2009), Young Neil in Scott Pilgrim vs. the World''
 Jason Smith (2004) — offensive tackle for St. Louis Rams, second overall selection of 2009 NFL Draft
 Scott Verplank (1982) – professional golfer
 Terrance Williams (2008) – wide receiver for Dallas Cowboys

References

External links 

 
 W. T. White PTO website
 "WRA Architects Designed Major Renovations for Dallas ISD W. T. White High School ." WRA Architects. November 23, 2015.

Dallas Independent School District high schools
Public high schools in Dallas